Sinsinawa is an unincorporated community in Grant County, Wisconsin, United States. The community is in the towns of Jamestown and Hazel Green, one mile north of the border with Illinois. The town is best known for being the mother house of the Sinsinawa Dominican Sisters.

History
The community's name means either "rattlesnake" or "Home of the Young Eagle" in Sioux. The first white settler in the area was George Wallace Jones, who purchased land for a lead smelter in 1827. He soon sold the land to the Dominican priest Samuel Mazzuchelli, who subsequently built a men's college, Sinsinawa Mound College, in 1846. Mazzuchelli founded the Sinsinawa Dominican Sisters in 1847. This religious order founded a women's college and high school in Sinsinawa in 1865.

Sinsinawa Mound
Sinsinawa Mound is a cone-shaped hill in the area, from which the area gets its name.  Sinsinawa River runs along the hill south towards the Mississippi River in Illinois.

The Sinsinawa Mound raid of June 29, 1832, part of the Black Hawk War, took place near Sinsinawa Mound. In August 2007 there was a commemoration of the 175th anniversary on the war.

Notes

External links
Sinsinawa, the word Sinsinawa and Sinsinawa Mound from the Dictionary of Wisconsin History, published by the Wisconsin State Historical Society

Unincorporated communities in Grant County, Wisconsin
Unincorporated communities in Wisconsin